George Dungan III is a member of the state legislature in the U.S. state of Nebraska. and a public defender.

Dungan was elected to represent Nebraska's 26th district in 2022, prevailing over opponent Russ Barger. The election was marked by an incident in which an attack ad created by a pro-Barger political action committee used a photograph of another man, Dustin Rymph, misidentified as Dungan.

Electoral history

References

Living people
Democratic Party Nebraska state senators
21st-century American politicians
Politicians from Lincoln, Nebraska
Year of birth missing (living people)